The South African Railways Class 15F 4-8-2 of 1938 is a steam locomotive.

The Class 15F was the most numerous steam locomotive class in South African Railways service. Between 1938 and 1948, 255 of these locomotives with a 4-8-2 Mountain type wheel arrangement entered service.

Manufacturers
 
The Class 15F 4-8-2 Mountain type steam locomotive was designed by W.A.J. Day, Chief Mechanical Engineer (CME) of the South African Railways (SAR) from 1936 to 1939, based on the design of the Class 15E by his predecessor, A.G. Watson, and later modified again by his successor, M.M. Loubser. It was built in five batches by four locomotive manufacturers in Germany and the United Kingdom over a period of ten years spanning the Second World War.
 The first 21 were built in Germany in 1938. Seven were delivered by Berliner Maschinenbau, numbered in the range from 2902 to 2908, and fourteen by Henschel and Son, numbered in the range from 2909 to 2922.

 Another 44 were built by the North British Locomotive Company (NBL) of Glasgow in 1938. They were delivered in 1939, numbered in the range from 2923 to 2966.
 Locomotive building was interrupted by the Second World War, but because of a critical motive power shortage that developed in South Africa during the war, manufacturing of the Class 15F was resumed even before hostilities had ceased. In 1944, production started on thirty locomotives by Beyer, Peacock and Company (BP), delivered later that same year and numbered in the range from 2967 to 2996.
 In 1945, sixty were built and delivered by NBL, numbered in the range from 2997 to 3056.
 The final batch of 100 Class 15Fs were built by NBL in 1946 and 1947 and delivered between 1946 and 1948, numbered in the range from 3057 to 3156.

Lineage
The Class 15F represented the ultimate stage in a long history of development spanning thirty years. The first Class 15 4-8-2 tender loco­motive entered SAR service in 1914.

Characteristics

The Class 15F locomotive was similar to its predecessor Class 15E, but it was built with Walschaerts valve gear as specified by Day, who was not a protagonist of rotary cam poppet valve gear. This and some other differences led to these engines being designated Class 15F. The locomotives used Stone's electric lighting, with a 150 watt Tonum E type headlight, cab lighting which included a light over the reversing controls, a bunker light and rear headlights on the tender. The locomotive was capable of traversing curves of  radius with  gauge widening.

The Class 15F was delivered with a Watson Standard no. 3B boiler and a Watson cab. During the 1930s, Day's predecessor as CME, A.G. Watson, designed a standard boiler type as part of his standardisation policy. Many serving locomotives were reboilered with these Watson Standard boilers and in the process most of them were also equipped with Watson cabs with their distinctive slanted fronts, compared to the conventional vertical fronts of their original cabs. New locomotives that were acquired in the Watson era and later, such as the Class 15F, were built with such boilers and cabs.

To fit within the loading gauge, the Watson Standard no. 3B boiler was domeless.

The pre-war locomotives were equipped with two large inclined Ross-pop safety valves, mounted on the upper sides of the boiler just ahead of the firebox and aimed about 80 degrees apart. When these inclined valves blew off under a station canopy, bystanders often received a shower of slimy wet soot. After the war, they were replaced by four smaller Ross-pop valves at the highest point of the boiler that blew off straight up.

The cylinder barrels had cast iron liners. The valve gear, brake gear and the hubs on the coupled wheels were fitted with soft grease lubricating nipples while the bronze axle boxes and connecting and coupling rods had hard grease lubrication. The leading and trailing wheels were fitted with roller bearings. The axle boxes and motion were similar to those of the Classes 15CA and 23 and were interchangeable in most cases.

Pre-war models
The pre-war Class 15Fs were manually stoked and were delivered without smoke deflectors. The original 21 Berliner- and Henschel-built engines remained hand-fired for the full duration of their working lives. On the pre-war NBL-built engines, on the other hand, provision was made in the design to later convert them to mechanical stoking. A mechanical stoker was tested on no. 2923 before the remaining locomotives of that group were all equipped with such stokers by the late 1940s. Their brake systems consisted of steam brakes on the engines and vacuum brakes on the tenders.

One of the Henschel-built locomotives, no. 2916, is documented as having had a lighter all-up weight and different axle loads than the rest of the engines from the same batch, although its adhesive weight was more than a ton heavier. While sources are silent on the reason for the differences, it is known that this engine was oil-fired, although it is not clear whether it was delivered as an oil-burner or modified post-delivery.

Post-war models
The post-war locomotives were built to the design and specifications of Dr. M.M. Loubser, who succeeded Day as CME in 1939. His specifications included mechanical stokers, vacuum brakes on the coupled wheels as well as the tenders, with two  diameter brake cylinders on the engine and two  diameter cylinders on the tender, and elephant-ear smoke deflectors instead of smokebox handrails.

The engine's vacuum brake cylinders were fitted outside the main frames under the running boards on each side, between the second and third pairs of coupled wheels. The vacuum brake operated automatically whenever the train brakes were applied. The use of vacuum braking instead of steam braking became standard practice on locomotives built from 1944 onwards and was welcomed by SAR drivers, who were always reluctant to make use of steam brakes for fear of skidding the coupled wheels. In practice, the trigger on the steam brake attachment to isolate the proportional device which admitted steam to the brake cylinder automatically upon the application of the vacuum brake, was invariably wedged down with a wooden peg by drivers to eliminate the steam brake entirely.

Loubser also modified the leading bogie to have swing links with three-point suspension which eliminated the side control springs that were used on earlier versions. As a unit, the modified bogie was interchangeable with those of earlier versions and with those of the Classes 15E and 23.

The engines from Beyer, Peacock were war-time austerity models on which planished steel boiler lagging was replaced by ordinary steel lagging, while cosmetic dressing items like stainless steel lagging bands, chrome-plated handrails and rounded corners on the front of the firebox lagging were absent or replaced by unplated items. While the boiler barrels of the pre-war engines were of nickel steel, the austerity locomotives had boiler barrels made of carbon steel with steel plates of  greater thickness.

Like the pre-war NBL-built engines, the early post-war locomotives built by BP and NBL in 1944 and 1945 were delivered with Type JT tenders which had a  coal capacity and a  water capacity. As delivered, they were arranged for manual stoking, but with provision made in their design for their subsequent conversion to mechanical stoking. All these locomotives were equipped with mechanical stokers post-delivery.

The locomotives in the final batch of 100 that were received from NBL in 1947 and 1948, numbers 3057 to 3156, were delivered new complete with mechanical stokers. These engines were delivered with Type ET tenders, which also had a  coal capacity, but a smaller  water capacity to accommodate the mechanical stoker mechanism, while its empty weight was  more due to the additional stoking equipment. These appear to have been the only differences between the Types JT and ET tenders. Apart from these differences, the post-war locomotives were identical to the earlier ones. Elephant ear smoke deflectors were later installed on the pre-war locomotives as well.

Locomotive naming
Although the naming of locomotives in South Africa dates back to the Cape Town Railway and Dock Company's 0-4-2 locomotives of 20 March 1860 and the Natal Railway's 0-4-0WT Natal of 13 May 1860, it was rarely done. In 1945, the Minister of Transport at the time, the Honourable F.C. Sturrock MP, instructed that a number of Classes 15F and 23 engines should be named after various South African cities and towns and fitted with suitable nameplates in both official languages. The decorative plates were fitted to the sides of the smokebox or to the elephant ear smoke deflectors of engines which were so equipped. Twelve Class 15F locomotives were named.

 No. 3044 - Kroonstad
 No. 3045 - Harrismith
 No. 3046 - City of Bloemfontein
 No. 3047 - City of Pretoria
 No. 3049 - City of Johannesburg
 No. 3050 - Springs
 No. 3051 - Vereeniging
 No. 3052 - Brakpan
 No. 3053 - Benoni
 No. 3054 - Bethlehem
 No. 3055 - Germiston
 No. 3056 - Potchefstroom

In later years, some of these names migrated to other engines and classes, with several eventually ending up on Classes 23 and 25NC locomotives.

Service
While the Class 15F was used predominantly in the Orange Free State and Western Transvaal, it also saw service in every system country-wide, including Garratt territory in Natal where it was used on the line from Newcastle to Utrecht.

During 1947 King George VI, accompanied by Queen Elizabeth and the Princesses Elizabeth and Margaret, visited the British territories in Southern Africa. The Royal Visit began in Cape Town on 17 February. Transport during the Royal Visit was aboard the Royal Train of the SAR, hauled by selected British-built locomotives. Class 15F no. 3030 took the Royal Train on its first leg, departing from Table Bay Harbour's Duncan Dock in Cape Town on 21 February. The same locomotive was also in charge of the train's last leg two months and  later, when it brought the Royal Train back to Duncan Dock.

On the Western Transvaal System, the Class 15F was for many years the mainstay of mainline steam at Germiston, working to Witbank, Volksrust and Kroonstad. In 1956 it was decided to temporarily allocate thirty Class GMA Garratts to the Witbank-Germiston section during the transition period from steam to electric working. This released thirty Class 15Fs for the Orange Free State, of which thirteen were required for increases in traffic and seventeen to replace seventeen Class 23s, required for increases in traffic on the Cape Northern System.

In February 1957, the Cape Midland System received its first two Class 15F locomotives, transferred from the Cape Western System's Paarden Eiland shed to Sydenham in Port Elizabeth. By July 1957 there were nine at Sydenham, three at Cradock and one at Noupoort. There was a brief period when both Systems were using Class 15Fs on the mainline. On the Midland, several of the locomotives were equipped with chimney cowls from 1960 onwards to ease the smoke nuisance for footplatemen in the many tunnels, but these were of dubious effectiveness.

By late 1959, the fast Natal-bound passenger trains were worked from Germiston to Volksrust by Class  or Class  diesel-electrics, but the lesser passenger trains were still being worked by Volksrust-based Class 15Fs. By mid-1965, the Volksrust locomotives were transferred back to the Germiston shed upon completion of the electrification of the Natal mainline.

The Class 15F also briefly served on the Cape Eastern system when some worked out of East London in the early 1960s.

Some briefly served outside South Africa's borders. In 1978, six Class 15Fs 3000, 3031, 3066, 3072, 3094, 3126 were hired to Rhodesia Railways, but they were returned nine months later and replaced by Class GMAM Garratts.

When the Class 23 was withdrawn, many of the Class 15F locomotives that were equipped with mechanical stokers inherited their huge twelve-wheel Type EW tenders which, apart from increasing their range with its larger fuel and water capacity, also greatly enhanced their appearance. In later years when the Class 15F was relegated to heavy shunting and local work, many of the locomotives had their mechanical stokers removed.

Preservation

Given its usefulness and the large quantity placed in service with the SAR, there were many efforts to save a significant number at the end of the steam era. About 60 survived into the 21st century, most still owned by the THF. Since that time (Year 2000), many have now been scrapped with more scrapping expected, especially those stored at Millsite (Krugersdorp) which have been stripped by thieves. This is a list of what remains today (January 2019).

No. 3052 Avril formerly owned by the artist David Shepherd, now owned by Sandstone and in the custody of Reefsteamers was loaned out to FOTR. It was derailed near Cullinan on 21 March 2017 while working an FOTR train following the theft of some 250 metres of rail. Damage was minimal, mainly being confined to the destruction of the cowcatcher. However, the loan was terminated and the locomotive returned to the custody of Reefsteamers at Germiston.

In 2006, NBL-built no. 3007 was returned to its builder's home city, Glasgow in Scotland, where it was initially put on static display in George Square for fundraising purposes by the North British Locomotive Preservation Group. The move of no. 3007 from staging in the Bloemfontein locomotive depot to Glasgow was recorded in Season 3 of the television documentary series Monster Moves in 2008. The locomotive was originally to have been trucked to Durban by Moveright International, but the transporter was not capable of carrying the locomotive. Instead, it was towed by rail on a two-day journey across the country, with ten flat wagons used to augment the braking capacity of the locomotives which hauled the Class 15F. The locomotive now resides in the Glasgow Museum of Transport's collection at the new Riverside Museum.

Commemoration
A 40c postage stamp depicting a Class 15F locomotive was one of a set of four commemorative postage stamps that were issued by the South African Post Office on 27 April 1983 to commemorate the steam locomotives of South Africa, which were rapidly being withdrawn from service at the time. The artwork and stamp design was by the noted stamp designer and artist Hein Botha. The particular locomotive depicted was NBL-built Class 15F no. 2954. The outline of a traditional SAR locomotive number plate was used as a commemorative cancellation for De Aar on the date of release.

Works numbers
The table shows the Class 15F engine numbers, builders, years built and works numbers.

Illustration
The main picture shows pre-war NBL-built no. 2940 Lynette with an ex Class 23 type EW tender, at speed near Princess station on the Johannesburg-Magaliesburg line on 6 April 1992.

References

External links

1870
4-8-2 locomotives
2D1 locomotives
Berliner locomotives
Henschel locomotives
NBL locomotives
Beyer, Peacock locomotives
1870
1870
Cape gauge railway locomotives
Railway locomotives introduced in 1938
1938 in South Africa